The Rosario Chapel is a painting by Mexican artist Juan Soriano, created in 1960. The work is an oil on canvas and its dimensions are 125.6 x 75.4 cm The painting is part of the collection of Museo Soumaya in Mexico City and recently was part of the retrospective exhibition, Juan Soriano 1920-2006, organized by the Museum of Modern Art in Mexico.

Description
The painting highlights the topics of color and abstractionism, which were important characteristics of this particular period in Soriano's work. It is also a characteristic that he shared with the artists of the Breakthrough Generation, such as Francisco Toledo.

References

1960 paintings
Mexican paintings